McGuckin is an anglicization of the Irish surname Mag Eocháin. The female form of the name in Irish is Nic Eocháin. This surname is most common in south County Londonderry followed by east County Tyrone, both in Northern Ireland. The surname translates as "Son of Eocha" or "Eochán", a diminutive of the name Eochaidh. Similar to the Scottish Gaelic name Eachann. The McGuckin sept are thought to be of the Cenél nEógain of the Uí Néill.

People
William McGuckin de Slane, nineteenth-century Irish orientalist;
Kieran McGuckin, senior hurler for Cork;
Barton McGuckin, Irish tenor singer;
John Anthony McGuckin, Orthodox Christian scholar, priest, and poet;
Genevieve McGuckin, musician and songwriter;
Kevin McGuckin, senior Gaelic footballer for Derry;
Mark McGuckin, Canadian television presenter;
Aislin McGuckin, ex-Heartbeat actress;
Ed McGuckin, American professional wrestler;
Jack McGuckin, American Chef;
Kieran McGuckin Scottish Swimmer